Gallant, also known as Clear Springs or Greasy Cove, is a census-designated place and unincorporated community in Etowah, and St. Clair counties, Alabama, United States. It lies west of the city of Gadsden, the county seat of Etowah County. As of the 2010 census, its population was 855.  It has a post office with the ZIP code 35972.

Gallant was the name of a pioneer settler who came from Tennessee.

Recreation
Camp Sumatanga is a 1700-acre facility surrounded by the woods, mountains, lakes and streams. The many recreational activities available include fishing, swimming, archery, hiking, and camping. Summer camp is available for children. There are three chapels that are available for reservation for weddings and other ceremonies.

Dayspring Dairy is Alabama's first sheep dairy, offering hard and soft farmstead cheeses, a farm store with free tasting, and farm tours.

Demographics

References

Census-designated places in Etowah County, Alabama
Census-designated places in Alabama
Unincorporated communities in Etowah County, Alabama
Unincorporated communities in Alabama